Derevenka is a rural locality (a village) in Parfyonovskoye Rural Settlement, Velikoustyugsky District, Vologda Oblast, Russia. The population was 4 as of 2002.

Geography 
The distance to Veliky Ustyug is 14.5 km, to Karasovo is 3 km. Nizhneye Gribtsovo is the nearest rural locality.

References 

Rural localities in Velikoustyugsky District